Khumra may refer to:

 Khumra (Islam), an Islamic community in India
 Khumra (Judaism), a prohibition or obligation in Jewish practice
 Ali Abu Khumra (born 1981), Iraqi filmmaker